Shoal Bay is a locality in the Northern Territory of Australia located about  east of the territory capital of Darwin.

The locality is named after the nearby bay which was named in 1839 by Commander Wickham and Lieutenant Stokes during HMS Beagle third survey expedition.

The 2016 Australian census which was conducted in August 2016 reports that Shoal Bay had no people living within its boundaries.

Shoal Bay is located within the federal division of Lingiari, the territory electoral division of Nelson and the local government area of the Litchfield Municipality.

References

Suburbs of Darwin, Northern Territory